George Percy Wilmot (17 February 1881 – 25 April 1950) was an Australian rules footballer who played with Collingwood in the Victorian Football League (VFL).

Notes

External links 

Percy Wilmot's profile at Collingwood Forever

1881 births
1950 deaths
Australian rules footballers from Victoria (Australia)
Collingwood Football Club players